"Like I Do" is a song by American contemporary R&B group For Real, issued as the lead single from the group's second album Free. The remix of the song samples "No One's Gonna Love You" by The S.O.S. Band, and it was the group's highest chart appearance on the Billboard Hot 100, peaking at #72 in 1996.

Music video

The official music video for "Like I Do" was directed by Kevin Bray.

Track listing
On the European CD single:-

1. Like I Do (Original Mix) 4:08
2. Like I Do (No One's Gonna Love You - Full Crew Old Skool Mix) 4:14
3. Like I Do (No One's Gonna Love You - Wop Dem Dancehall Mix Mix) 5:55
4. Like I Do (Junior's Full Vocal Mix) 8:47
5. Like I Do (Junior's Club Dub) 8:31
6. Like I Do (No One's Gonna Love You - Dallas Austin Remix) 4.15

Chart positions

References

1996 singles
For Real songs
Music videos directed by Kevin Bray (director)
Rowdy Records singles
Song recordings produced by Dallas Austin
Songs written by Dallas Austin
Songs written by Holland–Dozier–Holland
1996 songs